Aura II: The Sacred Rings is an adventure-genre computer game created by Canadian studio Streko-Graphics Inc. and published by The Adventure Company.

Critical reception
The game has a Metacritic rating of 44% based on 18 critic reviews.

References

External links
 Aura II: The Sacred Rings official website
 Aura II: The Sacred Rings publisher
 Aura II: The Sacred Rings developer

Windows games
Windows-only games
2007 video games
Aura (video game series)
Video game sequels
Adventure games
Video games developed in Canada
The Adventure Company games
Single-player video games